Karson Kuhlman (born September 26, 1995) is an American professional ice hockey center currently playing for the Winnipeg Jets of the National Hockey League (NHL).

Playing career

Amateur
Kuhlman began his career playing with Cloquet High in the Minnesota State High School League (USHS) from 2010 to 2013. He was selected in the 2011 United States Hockey League (USHL) Futures Draft 48th overall by the Dubuque Fighting Saints. He made his USHL debut with the Fighting Saints in the 2011–12 season, appearing in five games before splitting the following 2012–13 season between high school hockey and the USHL, joining the Dubuque for the entirety of the playoffs in their eventual Clark Cup championship.

Kuhlman played one full season in 2013–14 with the Dubuque Fighting Saints, where he scored 25 goals and 19 assists for 44 points in 56 appearances, and was selected to play in the USHL All-Star Game. He committed to play collegiate hockey at the University of Minnesota Duluth for the Bulldogs men's ice hockey team in the NCAA's National Collegiate Hockey Conference (NCHC).

In his freshman season with the Bulldogs during the 2014–15 season, Kuhlman scored 8 goals and 10 assists for 18 points as the team earned a bid in the NCAA Tournament. Showing early leadership potential, he served as an alternate captain as a sophomore in the 2015–16 season, scoring 12 goals and 20 points in 40 games.

Kuhlman enjoyed a successful junior campaign in the 2016–17 season, scoring 6 goals and 16 assists for a career-high 22 points in 42 games, as the Bulldogs advanced to the Frozen Four before falling to the University of Denver in the NCAA Championship game. Approaching his final collegiate season, Kuhlman was announced as team captain for the 2017–18 season.

Kuhlman continued to contribute in playing as a two-way forward, collecting 13 goals and 20 points in 44 games. He was named the 2018 NCAA Tournament MVP after leading the Bulldogs with a goal and an assist in the team's 2–1 victory over the University of Notre Dame in the NCAA Championship. He completed his collegiate career ranking seventh all-time in the NCAA with 166 consecutive collegiate games played.

Professional

Having been unselected in any NHL Entry Draft, and following his championship title with the Bulldogs, Kuhlman signed a two-year, entry-level contract with the Boston Bruins on April 11, 2018. He immediately joined Boston's American Hockey League (AHL) affiliate, the Providence Bruins, on an amateur try-out contract to conclude the 2017–18 season.

After attending the Bruins' training camp ahead of the 2018–19, Kuhlman was assigned to begin the year with Providence. After a slow offensive start to the season, Kuhlman began contributing as a rookie with Providence, scoring 12 goals and 25 points before earning his first call-up to Boston on February 14, 2019, following an injury to David Pastrňák. He made his NHL debut in a 4–2 victory over the Los Angeles Kings at the Staples Center on February 17. He scored his first NHL goal in his second game with the Bruins in a 6–5 overtime victory over the San Jose Sharks on February 19.

On April 15, 2019, Kuhlman recorded his first career Stanley Cup playoff point with an assist on a goal by David Krejčí in a 3–2 loss to the Toronto Maple Leafs. On June 9, he scored his first Stanley Cup playoff goal with a goal against the St. Louis Blues in Game 6 of the Stanley Cup Finals.

In the  season, in a limited role having registering just 1 goal and 1 assist through 19 games, Kuhlman was placed on waivers by the Bruins and on January 18, 2022, Kuhlman was claimed by the Seattle Kraken. He continued with the Kraken for the remainder of the season, collecting 2 goals and 8 points through 25 appearances.

Returning to the Kraken for the  season, Kuhlman was reduced to a depth forward role, featuring in just 14 games through the opening months of the campaign. Kuhlman was placed on waivers by Seattle and he was claimed the following day by the Winnipeg Jets on December 13, 2022.

Career statistics

Regular season and playoffs

International

Awards and honors

References

External links

1995 births
Living people
American men's ice hockey centers
Boston Bruins players
Minnesota Duluth Bulldogs men's ice hockey players
University of Minnesota Duluth alumni
Ice hockey players from Minnesota
Providence Bruins players
Seattle Kraken players
Undrafted National Hockey League players
Winnipeg Jets players